Maurice Hauriou (17 August 1856 – 12 March 1929) was a French jurist and sociologist whose writings shaped French administrative law in the late 19th and early 20th century.

Hauriou taught public law at the University of Toulouse since 1888, and constitutional law since 1920. His work gave French administrative law a new dogmatic basis, including through his textbooks Précis de droit administratif et de droit public général (1892), Précis élémentaire de droit administratif (1925), Précis de droit constitutionnel (1923) and Principes de droit public (1910).

External links
Website dedicated to Maurice Hauriou

References

French jurists
French sociologists
Academic staff of the University of Toulouse
1856 births
1929 deaths
People from Charente
Officiers of the Légion d'honneur
Members of the Ligue de la patrie française
19th-century jurists
20th-century jurists